Stasys Šaparnis (born 2 October 1939) is a former Lithuanian modern pentathlete and Olympic medalist. He competed at the 1968 Summer Olympics in Mexico City, where he won a silver medal in the team competition, and placed ninth in the individual competition.

References

1939 births
Living people
Lithuanian male modern pentathletes
Soviet male modern pentathletes
Olympic modern pentathletes of the Soviet Union
Modern pentathletes at the 1968 Summer Olympics
Olympic silver medalists for the Soviet Union
Olympic medalists in modern pentathlon
Sportspeople from Panevėžys
Lithuanian male water polo players
Soviet male water polo players
Medalists at the 1968 Summer Olympics